Luis Alejandro Forero Castillo (born 17 February 2002) is a Venezuelan footballer who plays as a goalkeeper for Venezuelan Primera División side Hermanos Colmenarez.

Career

Club career
Forero is a product of Zamora. He sat on the bench for two games in the Venezuelan Primera División team of Zamora in March 2019, but never got his official debut.

In 2020, he moved to Yaracuyanos. 17-year old Forero got his official debut for the club on 8 February 2020 against Gran Valencia Maracay in the Primera División.

In January 2022, Forero moved to fellow league club Hermanos Colmenarez.

References

External links
 

Living people
2002 births
Association football goalkeepers
Venezuelan footballers
Venezuelan Primera División players
Zamora FC players
Yaracuyanos FC players
People from Barinas (state)